Taeniophyllum clementsii, commonly known as the fleshy threadfoot, is a species of leafless epiphytic orchid which only grows as single plants. It has short stems and flattened green roots pressed against the tree on which it is growing. Between five and fifty small, pale green, tube-shaped flowers are arranged on a zig-zagged flowering stem. The flowers open one at a time, with the flowering stem increasing in length as each flower opens. This orchid only grows in a small area of tropical North Queensland.

Description
Taeniophyllum clementsii is a leafless, epiphytic herb that only grows as single plants. Flowering occurs from July to October.

Taxonomy and naming
The fleshy threadfoot was first formally described in 2006 by David Jones and Bruce Gray who gave it the name Microtatorchis clementsii and published the description in The Orchadian. In 2014 Alexander Kocyan and André Schuiteman changed the name to Taeniophyllum clementsii.

Distribution and habitat
Taeniophyllum clementsii grows on higher altitude rainforest trees, often near the ends of the branches. It is only known from the Paluma Range National Park and the Mount Windsor National Park.

References

clementsii
Endemic orchids of Australia
Orchids of Queensland
Plants described in 2006